The FS Class E.621 was a class of five electric locomotives of the Italian State Railways (FS). They were rebuilt in 1947 from FS Class E.620, which was originally built in 1925. The main change was conversion from 650 V DC third rail to 3,000 V DC overhead line power supply.

Overview

The locomotives were built in 1925 by the Officine Meccaniche Reggiane, reusing electrical parts from withdrawn railcars. There were two 3-axle bogies and six traction motors, giving a maximum speed of 85 km/h. The motors were nose-suspended and geared to the axles.

The rebuild was done to enable the locomotives to work under a 3,000-volt overhead line power supply and to cope with a post-war shortage of locomotives. In order to use the electrical equipment, and the 650-volt motors, without excessive modifications, the metadyne system was adopted. This halved the line voltage of 3,000 volts to 1,500 volts.  The 1,500 volt supply was then fed to the motors in series pairs, giving 750 volts per motor. The power output was increased from 950 kW (continuous) to 1,350 kW (1 hour rating).

References

Further reading

    Giovanni Cornolò, Locomotive elettriche FS, Parma, Ermanno Albertelli Editore, 1983, pp. 195-198.
    Stefano Garzaro, Locomotive elettriche FS, editrice Elledi, 1986.
    Giovanni Cornolò Claudio Pedrazzini, Locomotive elettriche FS, Parma, Ermanno Albertelli Editore, 1983.
    Angelo Nascimbene, Aldo Riccardi, Ferrovie italiane anni '50 - Seconda parte, trazione elettrica, in Tutto treno tema, 1996, n. 9, p. 125
    Giovanni Cornolò, Dall'E.626 all'Eurostar. 1928-2008: ottant'anni di locomotive elettriche FS, Parma, Ermanno Albertelli, 2008, pp. 291-296, .

3000 V DC locomotives
Co+Co locomotives
E.621
Railway locomotives introduced in 1947
Standard gauge locomotives of Italy 
Rebuilt locomotives

Furry